Air Sylphe was a French aircraft manufacturer based in Villereau, Nord. The company specialized in the design and manufacture of powered parachutes in the form of ready-to-fly aircraft for the US FAR 103 Ultralight Vehicles and the European Fédération Aéronautique Internationale microlight categories.

The company seems to have gone out of business in the end of 2007.

The company built a line of single and two-seat powered parachutes, all using industrial ducted fans for propellers. Their designs included the single seat Air Sylphe 447 and the two-seat Air Sylphe Bi 582, which was noted as being produced in a special version for wheelchair aviators.

Aircraft

References

External links
Company website archives on Archive.org

Defunct aircraft manufacturers of France
Ultralight aircraft
Homebuilt aircraft
Powered parachutes